Jim Roque is a Canadian ice hockey former player and coach who is currently working as a pro scout for the Toronto Maple Leafs.

Career
Roque debuted for Lake Superior State in the 1983–84 season helping the Lakers to their first NCAA tournament in his sophomore season. After graduating in 1987 Roque immediately turned to coaching and was behind the bench when his alma mater won their first national title in 1988. Roque stayed in Sault Sainte Marie until 1991 when he left to become the head coach for the Minot Americans. After a short stint in the SJHL Roque returned to Lake Superior State as an assistant for 1994–95 before heading out a second time to become an assistant coach for Clarkson.

Roque was lured back to the Lakers once more when his old coach Frank Anzalone began a second tenure with the team and played assistant for four more years before Anzalone resigned and turned the team over to Roque. Anzalone's return was a disaster for the program, posting four consecutive seasons with single-digit wins (the first four in the 39-year history of the team). Roque responded immediately by getting the team their first winning season since the turn of the century and followed it up the year after with their first 20-win campaign since Jeff Jackson left in 1995–96. For the rest of his time with the team, Roque kept them close to the .500 mark but could only get them one more winning season before the university announced that they would not be renewing his contract after the 2013–14 season.

After leaving the university for the third time Roque was hired by the Arizona Coyotes as a pro scout.  He is now a pro scout with the Toronto Maple Leafs.

Head coaching record

College

References

External links

1963 births
Living people
Arizona Coyotes scouts
Canadian ice hockey coaches
Ice hockey people from Ontario
Lake Superior State Lakers men's ice hockey coaches
Lake Superior State Lakers men's ice hockey players
Sportspeople from Greater Sudbury
Toronto Maple Leafs scouts
Canadian ice hockey forwards